The Mission Theater and Pub is a movie theater and pub located in the northwest Portland, Oregon. Formerly a Swedish church and union hall, the theater was re-opened as a McMenamins establishment in 1987. The theater was known for featuring second-run films, until 2019 when a first-run operation was implemented, and for serving beer, wine, and food.

History
The building was built in 1913 and listed as the Swedish Evangelical Mission Covenant Church on the National Register of Historic Places on October 7, 1982.

See also
 Church of Sweden
 National Register of Historic Places listings in Northwest Portland, Oregon

References

External links

 Mission Theatre & Pub on the McMenamins site

1987 establishments in Oregon
Cinemas and movie theaters in Oregon
McMenamins
National Register of Historic Places in Portland, Oregon
Northwest District, Portland, Oregon
Theatres in Portland, Oregon
Theatres on the National Register of Historic Places in Oregon